The Castle of Molina de Aragón (also called alcázar or alcazaba) is a fortification in Molina de Aragón, Castile-La Mancha, Spain. It was declared Bien de Interés Cultural in 1931.

It is located on a hill commanding the surrounding valley, and is formed by an external line of walls with four gates and numerous towers, which defends the internal fortress.  The latter has six towers, of which four are currently in good conditions.  Originally, the line of towers included a village. It originated as a Moorish fortress (10th-11th century), built over a pre-existing Celtiberian castle. The fortress was used as residence of the lords of the taifa of Molina. El Cid resided here when he was exiled from Castile. In 1129 it was conquered from the Moors by Alfonso I of Aragon, who gave it the Lara family.

Sources

References

External links
Page at castillos.net 

Buildings and structures completed in the 11th century
Molina de Aragon
Molina de Aragon
Bien de Interés Cultural landmarks in the Province of Guadalajara